Interstate 65 (I-65) in the US state of Indiana traverses from the south-southeastern Falls City area bordering Louisville, Kentucky, through the centrally located capital city of Indianapolis, to the northwestern Calumet Region of the Hoosier State which is part of the Chicago metropolitan area. The Indiana portion of I-65 begins in Jeffersonville after crossing the Ohio River and travels mainly north, passing just west of Columbus prior to reaching the Indianapolis metro area. Upon reaching Indianapolis, the route alignment of I-65 begins to run more to the northwest and subsequently passes Lafayette on that city's east and north sides. Northwest of there, in west-central Jasper County, the route again curves more northward as it approaches the Calumet Region. Shortly after passing a major junction with I-80 and I-94, I-65 reaches its northern national terminus in Gary at I-90 which is carried on the Indiana East–West Toll Road. This is one of the principal Interstate Highways that cross the state, and, more specifically, intersect at the city of Indianapolis, that has given the state the nickname of "Crossroads of America".

Route description
I-65 enters the state northbound at Jeffersonville (across the Ohio River from Louisville, Kentucky) on the Abraham Lincoln Bridge; traffic exiting the state travels on the John F. Kennedy Memorial Bridge. I-65 travels past Clark State Forest before reaching Seymour to the north. I-65 intersects with U.S. Highway 50 (US 50), providing access to Seymour to the west. US 31 runs parallel to the Interstate until it reaches Indianapolis. North of Seymour, I-65 passes through Columbus. Just north of Columbus, I-65 runs near Camp Atterbury, an Indiana National Guard training base. The Interstate continues north into Indianapolis.

I-65 crosses the I-465 loop before reaching Indianapolis. The section of I-65 in Downtown Indianapolis overlaps I-70. The junctions are often referred to as the "North Split" and the "South Split", forming a section of Interstate locally known as the "Inner Loop" or "Spaghetti Bowl" due to the visual complexity of the overlapping freeways. The "North Split" was closed for reconstruction in early 2021 and is expected to reopen to traffic in late 2022. As part of that reconstruction, the old ramps are being replaced with ones that will eliminate the lane switching that drivers originally had to perform to stay on I-70 eastbound and I-65 northbound.

In 1999, the  segment of I-65 between the two I-465 interchanges was renamed the Kenneth "Babyface" Edmonds Highway. At milemarker 116, I-65 passes Crown Hill Cemetery, burial site and memorial of former-President Benjamin Harrison. I-65 leaves the I-465 loop on the northwest side of Indianapolis. The highway travels past Eagle Creek Park and it then passes the terminus of I-865 and picks up US 52.

The segment of I-65 north of Indianapolis heads in the direction of Chicago, Illinois. US 52 runs concurrently until the north side of Lebanon; US 52 runs parallel to I-65 from this point to Lafayette, located at about the halfway point between Indianapolis and Chicago. I-65 crosses the Wabash River in Lafayette and passes next to Prophetstown State Park.

North of Lafayette, I-65 parallels US 231 and passes through the open flatlands of northwest Indiana. Protruding from the fields are some of the hundreds of wind turbines of the Benton County Wind Farm and Fowler Ridge Wind Farm. At approximately mile 199.4 is the timezone boundary between Central Time (Jasper County) and Eastern Time (White County). As with all timezone changes on highways maintained by the Indiana Department of Transportation (INDOT), this change in timezone is not marked with any roadside signage.

Upon crossing into Lake County, over the Kankakee River, the highway is known as the Casimir Pulaski Memorial Highway. It is known as this from that point to its northern terminus.

History

Initial construction
Like all Interstate Highways in Indiana, I-65 was constructed in segments. There were six segments in the southern portion of the state between the Kentucky border and the south leg of I-465 in Indianapolis, nine within the I-465 loop and 11 more that made up the northern portion connecting the northwest side of Indianapolis to the Indiana Toll Road (I-90) in Gary.

The first section of I-65 to be completed in Indiana was a  stretch between a temporary connection with US 52 near Royalton in Boone County (just south of the present-day interchange with I-865) and the US 52 junction northwest of Lebanon, which opened in December 1960. The initial southern Indiana portion, running  between then-US 31E (now US 31) in Clarksville and US 50 east of Seymour, saw its first traffic in November 1961. The final of the 17 segments of I-65 outside of I-465,  from State Road 252 (SR 252) near Edinburgh to Southport Road on Indianapolis's far south side, opened on June 30, 1972.

Unlike for most of portions of I-70 within the I-465 beltway, several inner sections of I-65 were built throughout the overall project lifespan. However, the final three segments from the south side through the heart of the city, including the common portion of I-65 and I-70 (east leg of the "Inner Belt"), were not finished and opened to traffic until October 1976.

Subsequent improvements

Prior to 2004, the interchange from the Indiana Toll Road to southbound I-65 required making a physical left turn onto I-65 via a traffic signal; traffic from northbound I-65 to I-90 bypassed the traffic signal via an isolated right-turn lane. This deficiency has since been corrected by a grade-separation.

As part of the Operation Indy Commute project, INDOT began work in 2013 to widen I-65 on both northbound and southbound mainlines from exit 103 at Southport Road northward to the southern junction with I-465 (exit 106), adding auxiliary lanes in this section to improve merging of traffic entering southbound I-65 from I-465 and entering northbound I-65 from westbound Southport Road. To reduce congestion on I-65 South from I-465 west, the loop ramp from westbound I-465 was replaced by a flyover ramp to southbound I-65. The eastbound I-465 exit to southbound I-65 south was also expanded for improved merging with traffic from the new west-to-south flyover. Most of this work was completed in late 2014.

Exit list

Related routes

Auxiliary routes
I-65 has three auxiliary routes in Indiana:

: The Indiana segment of the incomplete beltway around the Louisville metropolitan area, running from I-65 in Clarksville to I-64 in New Albany and signed the Lee H. Hamilton Freeway. The Indiana segment, plus the Lewis and Clark Bridge across the Ohio River to connect the Indiana segment of I-265 with the Kentucky segment, was completed in December 2016 but is currently not signed as I-265 between I-65 and the new bridge.
: A beltway around Indianapolis, signed as the USS Indianapolis Memorial Highway.
: A connector from I-65 to the northwest corner of I-465 in Indianapolis.

Former business route

Business Loop 65 (BL 65) is a former business route of I-65 located in Lebanon and was the only business route for the entire route of I-65. The route took over the former alignment of US 52 and traveled up SR 39 (South Lebanon Street) from I-65 and then SR 32 (West South Street) back to I-65.

References

External links

Indiana Highway Ends: Interstate 65

 Indiana
65
Transportation in Indianapolis
Transportation in Gary, Indiana
Transportation in Clark County, Indiana
Transportation in Scott County, Indiana
Transportation in Jackson County, Indiana
Transportation in Bartholomew County, Indiana
Transportation in Shelby County, Indiana
Transportation in Johnson County, Indiana
Transportation in Marion County, Indiana
Transportation in Boone County, Indiana
Transportation in Clinton County, Indiana
Transportation in Tippecanoe County, Indiana
Transportation in White County, Indiana
Transportation in Jasper County, Indiana
Transportation in Newton County, Indiana
Transportation in Lake County, Indiana
Northwest Indiana